Richard Bevan Hays (born May 4, 1948) is an American New Testament scholar and George Washington Ivey Professor Emeritus of New Testament Duke Divinity School in Durham, North Carolina. He is an ordained minister in the United Methodist Church.

Education and career 
Hays received his Bachelor of Arts degree in English literature from Yale College, his Master of Divinity degree from Yale Divinity School, and his Doctor of Philosophy degree from Emory University.

Hays returned to Yale Divinity School as an Assistant Professor of New Testament in 1981 and taught there until 1991, when he moved to Duke Divinity School. He was named George Washington Ivey Professor of New Testament in 2002. In 2010, he became Dean of the Divinity School. He stepped down from the role of Dean in 2015 and went on medical leave following a diagnosis of pancreatic cancer. After successful treatment, he was able to return to teaching, and retired in 2018.

Scholarship
Hays is considered one of the world's leading New Testament scholars, with Stanley Hauerwas writing "There are few people I would rather read for the actual exposition of the New Testament than Richard Hays." Hays' work focuses on New Testament theology and ethics, the Pauline epistles, and early Christian interpretation of the Old Testament.

In the field of New Testament studies, Hays has often been identified with figures such as N. T. Wright and Luke Timothy Johnson. Some of Hays' studies surround the narrative interpretation of Scripture, the New Testament's use of the Old Testament, the subjective genitive reading of pistis Christou ("faith(fulness) of Christ") in Paul, and the role of community in the New Testament. Hays is well known for his criticisms of the Jesus Seminar and the modern Historical Jesus movement. Hays has also been vocal about his criticisms of Dan Brown's best-selling The Da Vinci Code for its controversial historical claims.

Christianity Today named Hays's book Moral Vision of the New Testament one of the top 100 most important religious books of the 20th century. As a theologically conservative Methodist, he has throughout the course of his career remained committed to his Wesleyan roots in emphasizing the importance of charity and friendship in the Christian life. Moreover, Hays is a committed pacifist. He makes his position clear in The Moral Vision of the New Testament, in which he argues that Jesus Christ taught his disciples to be non-violent.

In 2008, a Festschrift was published in his honor. The Word Leaps the Gap: Essays on Scripture and Theology in Honor of Richard B. Hays included contributions from Stanley Hauerwas, E. P. Sanders, James D. G. Dunn, Francis Watson, N. T. Wright, and Ellen F. Davis.

Selected works

Books

Edited by

Chapters

Journal articles

References

External links
 Hays' Profile at Duke Divinity School

1948 births
American Christian pacifists
American Christian theologians
American United Methodist clergy
Duke Divinity School faculty
Living people
Methodist pacifists
Methodist theologians
New Testament scholars
Place of birth missing (living people)
Yale Divinity School alumni
Yale College alumni